Golavabuka is a settlement in the City Municipality of Slovenj Gradec in northern Slovenia. The area is part of the traditional region of Styria. The entire municipality is now included in the Carinthia Statistical Region.

The local churches is dedicated to Saints Phillip and James and belong to the Parish of Šmartno pri Slovenj Gradcu. It was a Romanesque building that was rebuilt in the 16th century.

References

External links
Golavabuka at Geopedia

Populated places in the City Municipality of Slovenj Gradec
Slovenj Gradec